Jason Smith  is an American home baker who came to prominence as the winner of the thirteenth season of the Food Network television series Food Network Star. He had previously won the third season of Holiday Baking Championship. Smith most recently served as a judge on the Food Network series Best Baker in America.  He was a guest judge on the fourth season of the Christmas Cookie Challenge, appearing in episode 4. Jason Smith served as judge along with Shinmin Li during the first season of the Food Network series Holiday Wars.

References

External links
 

1977 births
American television chefs
Date of birth missing (living people)
Food Network chefs
Food Network Star winners
Living people
American male chefs
People from Grayson, Kentucky

Chefs from Kentucky